Hadas Yaron (born April 12, 1990) is an Israeli actress. She began acting as a child and made her film debut as a supporting actress in the 2006 film, Out of Sight. Yaron played lead character Shira Mendelman in the 2012 Israeli drama film, Fill the Void.  In September of that year, she received an Ophir Award and became the first Israeli to win Best Actress at the Venice Film Festival.

Early life
Yaron was born in Israel, to a secular Jewish family. She was raised in Tel Aviv. As an adolescent, she attended Tichon Eroni Alef Art School where she studied theatre.

After completing high school, Yaron served in the Israel Defense Forces (IDF) for two years as it is compulsory for women to serve in the military in Israel. "I was like a soldier but I wasn't a soldier," she said of her role in the army. "I was wearing my uniform, but I was in the educational system. I was kind of a guide in boarding school, like with kids and teenagers. I had a group and was with them all year long." She describes her years in the IDF as being "like a pause in your life".

Career

Hadas Yaron began acting at the age of eight and was first cast to perform in her first film, Out of Sight, at the age of 14. Out of Sight focuses on a young blind woman (Tali Sharon) who returns to Israel from the United States on learning that her cousin, Talia, has committed suicide, and her attempts to discover the reasoning behind it. Yaron portrayed a young Talia for flashbacks.

During and after her service in the army, Yaron worked as a waitress at a coffee shop in Dizengoff Street, Tel Aviv to make ends meet. She voiced the opinion that it's "funny that one night you're in an evening gown and the next you're back to serving coffee in the café". In an interview on "Good Evening with Guy Pines", the owner of the café remarked, "She's not a very good waitress. She trips and falls over everything."

Yaron auditioned for Rama Burshtein's film, Fill the Void, in 2010, and was cast in the lead role of Shira. Burshtein stated, "Hadas came towards the end of the process. I had seen everyone in Israel, but then she walked in and started the audition and I just burst out laughing like crazy because I knew that I had found her. The beauty of Hadas is that she didn't really understand what was happening. At one point I said to her, Hadas, you're 20 and you might be a huge star, what are you gonna do? She just smiled at me - this not understanding is really her beauty and what came through so well in the character of Shira."

The movie follows the lifestyle and choices of a family living among the Haredi Jewish community in Tel Aviv. Yaron's character, Shira, is an 18-year-old girl who is pressured to marry her deceased older sister's husband after the latter dies in childbirth. "It's all about emotions and choices and what leads you to do what you do," said Yaron. "I'm also young. But Shira is different from me because she is not familiar with all these feelings she experiences for the first time." Yaron found certain aspects of her character's relationship with her brother-in-law, Yochay, difficult to convey because she "had never done a part where there was romance" before. To become better acquainted with the traditions and regulations of Orthodox lifestyle, she began to learn the Hebrew blessings and, at Burshtein's request, attended all of the events that take place within the movie, including a wedding and a circumcision.

The film was received well, and critics praised Yaron's performance. In September, she won Best Actress at the Venice Film Festival and the Ophir Awards, Israel's version of the Oscars.

In 2018, Yaron appeared as Sarah in the film Mary Magdalene, written by Helen Edmundson and directed by Garth Davis.

Filmography

Awards

References

External links

1990 births
21st-century Israeli actresses
Living people
Israeli child actresses
Israeli film actresses
Volpi Cup for Best Actress winners